Ozark Catholic Academy is a Roman Catholic high school on the property of St. Joseph Catholic Church in Tontitown, Arkansas. It is affiliated with the Roman Catholic Diocese of Little Rock.

The school's student body was to originate from Tontitown, Bentonville, Cave Springs, Fayetteville, Rogers, Springdale, and Subiaco. It was the first upper secondary Catholic school to be created in the Northwest Arkansas area.

History
Circa 1998 people associated with the school began efforts to create a Catholic high school in the area.

It opened in 2018 with grades 9 and 10, with other grade levels added after. Originally the school used six classrooms in the Father Bandini Education Center on a temporary basis.

References

External links
 
 

Catholic secondary schools in Arkansas
Schools in Washington County, Arkansas
Educational institutions established in 2018
Roman Catholic Diocese of Little Rock
Catholic high schools in the United States
Private high schools in Arkansas
2018 establishments in Arkansas